The Party Zone is a crossover solid-state pinball machine released in 1991 by Midway (under Bally) designed by Dennis Nordman and programmed by Jim Strompolis. It is in a single playfield format and collaborates characters from previous pinball machines. It is the second pinball machine released after the Bally-Midway division was sold, yet still operated under the "Bally" name.

Backglass
The backglass as well as the playfield contain characters from previous games (who all meet up on this game at the Cosmic Cottage):
 The Party Animal from Bally Midway's 1987 Party Animal
 The Party Monsters from Midway's 1989 Elvira and the Party Monsters
 The Party Dude from Midway's 1990 Dr. Dude And His Excellent Ray
 Beside the skeleton in the group of Party Monsters, a Trog (video game) caveman, from the 1990 Midway arcade game Trog (video game), can be seen.

Reception
The Party Zone has received a total user rating of 7.490 on a scale of 10 and currently ranks #97 in the "Pinside Ranking".
One reviewer noted:

The knowledgeable staff and moderators of pinside have provided a rating of 8.317 out of 10, somewhat varying from the opinions of the public reviewers.

The Internet Pinball Database reviews of The Party Zone are divided into the categories: art, audio, playfield and gameplay. The average user rating given is 7.8/10. Individual ratings for the characters are 8.0/10 for art; 7.7/10 for audio; 7.9/10 for playfield and 7.8/10 for gameplay. 47% of users who reviewed the game gave it a rating of 9/10". One user made this comment:

Digital version
This game was released by FarSight Studios as a licensed table for The Pinball Arcade as the 32nd Table Pack, with the exclusion of the songs "Come fly with me" and "Purple Haze" due to license issues, notably, when a player scores the "Big Bang", the soundtrack plays "Pinball Wizard".  After Farsight Studios lost the license for Williams pinball tables in the summer of 2018, the table was removed from the game and later reappeared in the second wave of Williams tables available as downloadable content for Zen Studios' Pinball FX 3 in December of the same year after it obtained the license.

References

External links
 

1991 pinball machines
Bally pinball machines